is a village located in Nagano Prefecture, Japan. , the village had an estimated population of 3,693 in 1558 households, and a population density of 16 persons per km².

Geography
Ōkuwa is located in the Kiso Mountains of southwest Nagano Prefecture, bordered by the Atera Mountains to the west. The Kiso River flows through the village. Mount Utsugi (2864 meters) and Mount Minamikoma (2841 meters) are on the border of the village.

Surrounding municipalities
Nagano Prefecture
 Iida
 Komagane
 Iijima
 Agematsu
 Nagiso
 Ōtaki
Gifu Prefecture
 Nakatsugawa

Climate
The town has a climate characterized by characterized by hot and humid summers, and cold winters (Köppen climate classification Cfa).  The average annual temperature in Ōkuwa is 12.6 °C. The average annual rainfall is 1680 mm with September as the wettest month. The temperatures are highest on average in August, at around 25.1 °C, and lowest in January, at around 0.4 °C.

Demographics
Per Japanese census data, the population of Ōkuwa has decreased over the past 60 years.

History
The area of present-day Ōkuwa was part of ancient Shinano Province. The area developed as Suhara-juku and Nojiri-shuku two post stations on the Nakasendō highway connecting Edo with Kyoto during the Edo period. The present village of Ōkuwa was established on April 1, 1889 by the establishment of the modern municipalities system.

Education
Ōkuwa has one public elementary school and one public middle school operated by the town government. The village does not have a high school.

Transportation

Railway
 [JR Tōkai - Chūō Main Line
  -  -

Highway

International relations
 – Shelbyville, Illinois, USA, sister city

References

External links

Official Website 

 
Villages in Nagano Prefecture